William Gardiner (15 March 1770, in Leicester – 16 November 1853) was an English composer who is best known for his hymns. He published two collections of his works: Sacred Melodies (1808) and Music and Friends (1838). Gardiner's promotion of Ludwig van Beethoven led to the first performances of Beethoven's music in England in 1794.<ref>The Harvard University Hymn Book' Page 493 0674026969 2007  English composer William Gardiner was a stocking manufacturer and amateur musician whose enthusiastic support for the works of Ludwig van Beethoven led to the first performances of Beethoven's music in England in 1794."</ref>

In his Music and Friends'', Gardiner told the story of how the first work of Beethoven became known in Britain after arriving in a violin case of a priest
fleeing the French Revolutionary army.

Vegetarianism
Gardiner was a teetotaller and vegetarian. He lived on a milk and vegetable diet for several years but gave it up after a life-changing experience.  Gardiner stated that on one occasion he was dining with a "Mr. Brooke" an eccentric who placed a beef-steak on the table. He was offended that Gardiner refused to eat meat. Mr. Brooke put a horse pistol to Gardiner's head and declared he would shoot him if he did not eat the beef-steak. After this experience Gardiner gave up his vegetarian diet and resumed his former mode of living.

Selected publications
Music and Friends (3 volumes, 1838-1853)
The Music of Nature (1849)

References
 

1770 births
1853 deaths
People from Leicester
English composers
Musicians from Leicestershire